Danny Kah (born 5 May 1967 in Two Wells, South Australia) is a former ice speed skater from Australia, who represented his native country in three consecutive Winter Olympics, starting in 1988 in Calgary, Canada.

Kah retired from speedskating in 1994 but still holds the national records on the 5,000 and 10,000 meters. By 11 January 2009, Kah was placed 463rd on the Adelskalender, the rankinglist of all-time personal bests.

Achievements
World Allround Speed Skating Championships for Men (8 participations):
 1986, 1987, 1988, 1989, 1990, 1991, 1992, 1993
 Best result 7th in 1991
World Sprint Speed Skating Championships for Men (1 participation):
 1991
 Best result 26th in 1991
World Junior Speed Skating Championships (1 participation):
 1985
 18th in 1985

Personal records

References

External links
 
 DESG

1967 births
Living people
People from Two Wells, South Australia
Australian male speed skaters
Australian male short track speed skaters
Olympic speed skaters of Australia
Speed skaters at the 1988 Winter Olympics
Speed skaters at the 1992 Winter Olympics
Speed skaters at the 1994 Winter Olympics
Universiade medalists in short track speed skating
Universiade silver medalists for Australia
Competitors at the 1985 Winter Universiade